J. Harold Williams (December 18, 1888 - June 2, 1981) was an American professor and educator. He received his A.B., M.A. and Ph.D degrees from Stanford University, and worked as a lecturer and professor at UCLA from 1923 to 1946.

In 1946 Dr. Williams was appointed Provost of the Santa Barbara College of the University of California (Now UCSB), succeeding Clarence L. Phelps who had been president of the state college since 1918 and the first provost after the change to university status in 1944.

References

External links
 

1888 births
1981 deaths
University of California, Santa Barbara faculty
Stanford University alumni
University of California, Los Angeles faculty